Qarah Su Rural District is in the Central District of Khoy County, West Azerbaijan province, Iran. At the National Census of 2006, its population was 17,600 in 3,531 households. There were 9,977 inhabitants in 2,610 households at the following census of 2011. At the most recent census of 2016, the population of the rural district was 10,271 in 2,891 households. The largest of its 34 villages was Seyyed Taj ol Din, with 2,612 people.

References 

Khoy County

Rural Districts of West Azerbaijan Province

Populated places in West Azerbaijan Province

Populated places in Khoy County